Groes-faen is a village approximately three miles south of Llantrisant in the county borough of Rhondda Cynon Taf, Wales. It is in the historic county of Glamorgan.

The village began as a hamlet in the 1860s near a trade route from Cowbridge to Cardiff.

History 

The opening of the Bute & Mwyndy iron ore works during the 1850s had a huge impact on the small hamlet of Groes Faen. The census of 1861 shows that Groes Faen had become a village. Its population was 83 people in 17 households, of these 83 residents 17 were iron ore miners, meaning that on average each household had 4.9 residents with one being an iron ore miner. The village centre was the pub The Dynefor Arms, and the cottages surrounding it.

In the seventies, the nearby Brofiscin Quarry was used as a dump for toxic chemicals. The site was described by The Guardian in 2007 as "one of the most contaminated places in Britain". In 2007 research began to assess the potential environmental impact of seepage from the Quarry.

References 

Villages in Rhondda Cynon Taf